Colatooeciidae is a family of bryozoans belonging to the order Cheilostomatida.

Genera:
 Cigclisula Canu & Bassler, 1927
 Colatooecia Winston, 2005
 Trematooecia Osburn, 1940

References

Cheilostomatida